Boris Rodolfo Izaguirre Lobo (Caracas, 29 September 1965), better known as Boris Izaguirre, is a Venezuelan writer, TV host, screenwriter, journalist and showman.

Career 
Izaguirre wrote the scripts of some of the Venezuelan telenovelas: Ruby and La dama de rosa. After their success in Spain, he moved to Santiago de Compostela in Galicia, Spain.

In Spain, Izaguirre started to write scripts and appear on television shows. He became a prominent showman, especially after his participation in the late night television show Crónicas Marcianas.

Izaguirre has written articles for several publications, including Zero, El País Semanal, Fotogramas and Marie Claire. He was the host of the daily talk show Channel Nº4 alongside Ana García-Siñeriz on Cuatro from 2005 to 2008, when the program was cancelled. He also hosted the Miss Venezuela pageant in 2009, 2010, 2012, and 2013.

In February 2006, Izaguirre married his longtime boyfriend Rubén Nogueira.

He was finalist of the Premio Planeta in 2007 with his novel Villa Diamante.

Since 2015 Izaguirre is in the panel of televios show Suelta la Sopa on Telemundo (Miami, Florida) with descriptive segments that reveal the best kept secrets of favorite soap opera stars narrated in a docudrama style.

In 2018, Izaguirre participated in the reality television cooking show MasterChef Celebrity.

In 2019, Izaguirre hosted the talent show competition series Prodigios, on La 1.

Books

El vuelo de los avestruces (1991) novel
Azul petróleo (1998) novel
Morir de glamour (2000) essay
Verdades alteradas (2001) essay
1965 (2002) novel
Fetiche (2003) essay
Villa Diamante (2007) novel
Y de repente fue ayer (2009) novel
Dos monstruos juntos (2011) novel
 Un jardín al norte (2014) novel
Tiempo de tormenta (2018) novel

References

External links

https://web.archive.org/web/20051215140829/http://www.portalmix.com/cronicas/boris.shtml
 Boris Izaguirre in the IMDb

Spanish gay writers
Venezuelan LGBT writers
Spanish television presenters
Venezuelan expatriates in Spain
Venezuelan television presenters
Venezuelan people of Basque descent
Venezuelan emigrants to Spain
1965 births
Living people
Spanish male novelists
Spanish male screenwriters
Spanish essayists
Venezuelan novelists
Venezuelan male writers
Venezuelan screenwriters
Male essayists
Writers from Caracas
21st-century LGBT people